Upper Gravenhurst is a village and former civil parish, now in the parish of Gravenhurst, in the Central Bedfordshire district of the ceremonial county of Bedfordshire, England. In 1881 the parish had a population of 354. On 24 March 1888 the parish was abolished and merged with Lower Gravenhurst to form "Gravenhurst".

The Church of St Giles has been established in the village since the 12th Century. The first school in the village was built in 1870, today known as Gravenhurst Academy.

References

External links
 Gravenhurst history timeline
 Gravenhurst Academy

Villages in Bedfordshire
Former civil parishes in Bedfordshire
Central Bedfordshire District